The Azersun Arena is a football stadium in Yeni Suraxanı, Baku, Azerbaijan, opened in June 2015. The main tenant of the stadium is Qarabağ, who moved from their home at the Tofiq Bahramov Stadium when it was completed.

Construction
The stadium has a capacity of 5,800 viewers and is based in Yeni Suraxanı. The stadium opened in 2015.

See also
 List of football stadiums in Azerbaijan
 List of European stadiums by capacity

References

Football venues in Baku
Multi-purpose stadiums in Azerbaijan